Lucas Marques de Oliveira (born 24 May 1995), known as Lucas Marques, is a Brazilian professional footballer who plays for Vitória de Setúbal in Portugal. Mainly a defensive midfielder, he can also play as a right back.

Club career
Born in Osasco, São Paulo, Lucas Marques finished his formation with Internacional. On 23 May 2015 he made his first team – and Série A – debut, starting in a 1–1 away draw against Vasco da Gama.

In 2016, Lucas Marques was loaned to Lajeadense until the end of the year's Campeonato Gaúcho. Upon returning, he was assigned to the B-team, and opted to not renew his contract in December; he subsequently signed a one-year deal with Chapecoense on 4 January 2017.

On 30 December 2018, Santa Clara announced that they had signed Lucas Marques on a 2.5-year contract. Playing only five games during the first six months of the 2020–21 season, Marques was loaned out in January 2020 to Estoril for the rest of the season alongside his teammate Denis Pineda.

On 16 June 2021, he moved to the Liga Portugal 2 club Mafra.

Honours
Chapecoense
Campeonato Catarinense: 2017

References

External links

1995 births
People from Osasco
Footballers from São Paulo (state)
Living people
Brazilian footballers
Association football midfielders
Campeonato Brasileiro Série A players
Sport Club Internacional players
Clube Esportivo Lajeadense players
Associação Chapecoense de Futebol players
Esporte Clube Vitória players
Figueirense FC players
C.D. Santa Clara players
G.D. Estoril Praia players
C.D. Mafra players
Vitória F.C. players
Primeira Liga players
Liga Portugal 2 players
Brazilian expatriate footballers
Expatriate footballers in Portugal
Brazilian expatriate sportspeople in Portugal